Robert "Bob" Thomas Jones (born September 3, 1978) is an American football former long snapper in the National Football League for the New York Giants.

Football career
Jones played football at Penn State from 1998-2001 as a defensive lineman, being named a starter in each of those years. He went undrafted in the 2002 NFL Draft.

He eventually signed with the New York Giants, and was named the starting long snapper for the 2002 season. He performed the Giants' long snapping duties for the first 11 games of the 2002 NFL season before a botched snap leading to a safety and eventual loss to the Houston Texans resulted in his release.

References

1978 births
Living people
American football long snappers
New York Giants players
Penn State Nittany Lions football players
Players of American football from Ohio